Harold Roy Killin (born 18 July 1929), known as Roy Killin, is a former professional footballer who played as a full back in the Football League for Manchester United and Lincoln City. and finally with Peterborough United from 1954 to 1958. In 1947 he began playing for Manchester United Junior teams. In 1949 he became a full professional playing mainly in the reserve and "A" teams. He had no first team appearances.

In 1952 he transferred to Second Division Lincoln City where he had ten first team appearances. Killin began playing for non-league Peterborough United in 1954 and made 101 first team games. His playing career was cut short due to an injury in 1958 when the doctor told Killin that continued treatment could cause permanent damage to his right knee and therefore suggested a complete rest from playing for an extended period of time. In 1962 Killin moved with his family to Toronto, Canada and played two more years as a semi-pro in the National League before retiring as a professional in 1964.

Killin was born in Toronto, Ontario, Canada, and raised in Manchester, England. In 1947, he was signed by his hometown team, Manchester United, but never appeared for the first team. In the 1953–54 season, he played ten games (seven in the League) for Second Division side Lincoln City.  He also played for non-league team Peterborough United.

References

1929 births
Living people
Association football defenders
Canadian soccer players
Lincoln City F.C. players
Manchester United F.C. players
Peterborough United F.C. players
Footballers from Manchester
Soccer players from Toronto
Canadian expatriate soccer players
Canadian expatriate sportspeople in England